

Income in the United States is measured by the various federal agencies including the Internal Revenue Service, Bureau of Labor Statistics, US Department of Commerce, and the US Census Bureau. Additionally, various agencies, including the Congressional Budget Office compile reports on income statistics. The primary classifications are by household or individual. The top quintile in personal income in 2019 was $103,012 (included in the chart below). The differences between household and personal income are considerable, since 61% of households now have two or more income earners.

Median personal income in 2020 was $56,287 for full time workers.

This difference becomes very apparent when comparing the percentage of households with six figure incomes to that of individuals. Overall, including all households/individuals regardless of employment status, the median household income was $67,521 in 2020 while the median personal income (including individuals aged 15 and over) was $35,805.

While wages for women have increased greatly, median earnings of male wage earners have remained stagnant since the late 1970s. Household income, however, has risen due to the increasing number of households with more than one income earner and women's increased presence in the labor force.

Income Percentiles 2019 

Inflation adjusted US Dollars - see IRS for further reading IRS.GOV income statistics

Income at a glance

See also

 Compensation in the United States
 Economy of the United States
 Income inequality in the United States
 Socio-economic mobility in the United States
 Unemployment in the United States
 List of United States counties by per capita income

References

Further reading

INCOME STATISTICS AT IRS.GOV

External links 

Savings rate vs Fed rate from 1954 Historical relationship between the savings rate and the Fed rate - since 1954

 
Social class in the United States
United States